National Highway 320G, commonly referred to as NH 320G is a national highway in India. It is a secondary route of National Highway 20.  NH-320G runs in the state of Jharkhand in India.

Route 
NH320G connects Hat Gamaria, Jagannathpur, Baraiburu, Saddle, Manoharpur, Anandpur, Bano and Kolebira in the state of Jharkhand.

Junctions  
 
  Terminal near Hat Gamaria.
  near Manoharpur
  Terminal near Kolebira.

See also 
 List of National Highways in India
 List of National Highways in India by state

References

External links 

 NH 320G on OpenStreetMap

National highways in India
National Highways in Jharkhand